Yanda Nossiter (born 24 October 1976) is an Australian sprint canoeist who competed from the mid-1990s to the early 2000s (decade). Competing in two Summer Olympics, she earned her best finish of eighth in the K-4 500 m event at Atlanta in 1996.

References
Sports-Reference.com profile

1976 births
Australian female canoeists
Canoeists at the 1996 Summer Olympics
Canoeists at the 2000 Summer Olympics
Living people
Olympic canoeists of Australia